Calamba, officially the City of Calamba, is a 1st class component city in the province of Laguna, Philippines. According to the 2020 census, it has a population of 539,671 people.

Calamba is the regional center of the Calabarzon region. The city is known as the "Spring Resort Capital of the Philippines" because of its numerous hot spring resorts, which are mostly located in Barangays Pansol, Bucal, Bagong Kalsada, and Lingga.

According to the 2020 census, Calamba has a population of 539,671 people, making it the most populous local government unit in Laguna. It is the fifth-densest city in the province with more than 2,600 people per square kilometer after San Pedro, Biñan, Cabuyao, and Santa Rosa. Based on the overall rankings of the 2014 Cities and Municipalities Index, the city ranked 18th in the overall competitiveness (cities ranking) and first among cities in the Calabarzon region. Calamba is known to be Calabarzon's richest city, followed by Cabuyao, because of its numerous factories.

Calamba is the hometown of the de facto Philippine national hero, José Rizal.

Etymology

The name of the city is derived from Tagalog kalamba, meaning a wide-mouthed earthen water jar (also called balanga or banga). The origin of the name is reflected in the Calamba Jar landmark in city plaza, as well as the city's seal which depicts a water jar superimposed with a profile of José Rizal.

History

Early history

The oldest part of Calamba is believed to be Barangay Sucol where its first settlers remained. With the arrival of Spaniards, the whole area was converted into a hacienda, then a part of Tabuco (present-day Cabuyao). In 1639 Calamba was the site of a rebellion of Chinese farmers, who had been forcibly resettled there by Governor Sebastian Hurtado de Corcuera. This rebellion spread north of the Pasig River and eventually culminated in the deaths of over 20,000 Chinese in the whole region surrounding Manila. Calamba became an independent pueblo on August 28, 1742, and formed into the town of Calamba in 1770. In 1813, Calamba was placed in the hands of "encargados" by the Dominican Brothers, who divided it into portions and sold the haciendas to the natives during the American regime.

World War II
During the Japanese occupation in World War II, Calamba was the location of a massacre committed by the Imperial Japanese Army, in which at least 2,000 civilians were killed. The St. John the Baptist Church, established in 1859, was burned by the Japanese during World War II. It was reconstructed by Fr. Eliseo Dimaculangan. It was the christening site of José Rizal. The original baptismal font has been preserved and refurbished.

Cityhood

After a process of more than seven years, Calamba became the second component city of the Laguna by virtue of Republic Act No. 9024, "An Act Converting the Municipality of Calamba, Province of Laguna into a Component City to be known as the City of Calamba." R.A. 9024 was signed into law by President Gloria Macapagal Arroyo on March 5, 2001, at the Malacañan Palace. The Commission on Elections (COMELEC) then set the plebiscite for Calamba's cityhood on April 21, 2001, where 15,056 residents participated. 3,413 or 22.67% voted "No" while the remaining 77.33% voted "Yes" to Calamba's conversion into a component city.

Events leading to Cityhood
As early as 1994, the town's Sangguniang Bayan approved Resolution No. 60, Series of 1994 requesting the Senate of the Philippines through its president and the House of Representatives through its speaker to co-sponsor a bill for Calamba's conversion into a city. It was only after two years that another resolution, Resolution No. 115 was passed requesting then Congressman Joaquin M. Chipeco Jr, to co-sponsor a bill for Calamba's cityhood and requesting the Sangguniang Panlalawigan for their comments and recommendations regarding the matter. Another two years passed before House Bill No. 986 and Senate bill Nos. 1630 and 1791 were filed in the House of Representatives by Congressman Chipeco and Senate of the Philippines by Senators Franklin M. Drilon and Sergio Osmeña III, respectively.

It was only in the year 2000 that the motion for Calamba's cityhood was fast-tracked. Then Mayor Severino J. Lajara requested favorable endorsement of House Bill No. 986 from the Sangguniang Panlalawigan on January 3, 2000. The Sangguniang Bayan also endorsed House Bill No. 986 and Senate Bill Nos. 1630 and 1791 and also requested favorable endorsement from the Sangguniang Panlalawigan in the same month. A month passed and Mayor Lajara sent a follow-up letter to then Vice Governor Teresita "Ningning" Lazaro on updates regarding the matter.

On March 8, the House Committee on Local Government approved House Bill No. 986 on 2nd reading at a hearing held at Hotel Rembrandt, Quezon City. The same House Committee conducted a public hearing on House Bill No. 986 at the Calamba Elementary School (Central II) gymnasium on March 23, approving the House Bill in principle. House Bill 986 was deliberated in April by the House of Representatives in plenary session and approved as House Bill No. 10661, which was then filed with the Senate of the Philippines in June.

The year 2001 came and brought about approval on 2nd reading of Senate Bill Nos. 1630 and 1791 and House Bill No. 10661 in a hearing held on February 5 at the Ambrocio Padilla Hall, Senate of the Philippines. Three days later, February 8, Senate Bill Nos. 1630 and 1791 and House Bill No. 10661 was deliberated in Plenary Session and was approved as Republic Act No. 9024.

Designation as regional center
Calamba was declared the regional center of the Calabarzon region by then President Gloria Arroyo by virtue of Executive Order No. 246, dated October 28, 2003.

Geography

Calamba lies on the northern slopes of Mount Makiling, a dormant volcano. The southern terminus of the South Luzon Expressway is in Calamba and this geographic position makes the city a gateway to the southern provinces of Luzon. The highway at the end of the South Luzon Expressway leads east to the other towns of Laguna and south towards the provinces of Batangas and Quezon.

The city is bordered by Cabuyao to the north and to the west, Los Baños to the east, by the province of Batangas and Cavite to the south, specifically the cities of Tanauan, Santo Tomas and municipality of Talisay in Batangas. and the City of Tagaytay in Cavite. Laguna de Bay, the country's largest lake, forms the city's northeast border.

Land uses

Barangays
Calamba is politically subdivided into 54 barangays, the smallest administrative unit in the city.

Climate
Calamba has a tropical monsoon climate (type Am), with a short dry season and a longer rainy season. The dry season lasts only from January to April, and the rest of the year is characterized by high levels of rainfall.

Demographics
The population of Calamba is fast-growing with an intercensal growth rate of 5% from 1995 to 2000, repeated and more in subsequent decades (except for 2007 to 2010 census).

According to the 2020 census, Calamba has a population of 539,671 inhabitants, making it the most populated city in Laguna province, followed by Santa Rosa, Biñan, San Pedro City, Cabuyao, and San Pablo. Calamba is the 24th most populated city in the Philippines.

Calamba is predominantly Roman Catholic (84.22%), followed by Members Church of God International (MCGI or ADD)(4.5%), Protestants (3.43%), Iglesia Ni Cristo (3.14%), and Islam (0.26%).

Economy 

Calamba is known today as the "Richest City in Calabarzon", (according to the 2014 Commission on Audit Annual Audit Report), as it registered a total income of ₱2,501,048,126.00. Calamba is also considered one of the "Next Wave Cities" for outsourcing firms.

The major income sources comes from manufacturing and economic plants, tourism, agriculture and services. There are many manufacturing and economic plants located in upland barangays like Canlubang, Real, La Mesa, Milagrosa, Makiling, Punta, Barandal, Batino and Prinza.

Income

Banking 
As of December 31, 2013, there are 83 banking offices operating in the city that offers banking services to businesses and residents according to Philippine Deposit Insurance Corporation. Calamba is the top city in Calabarzon with total deposits amounting to 29,632,884 in thousand pesos from 374,122 accounts.

Industries and manufacturing 

The city is a haven for industries. Considered the heart of Calabarzon due to the number of companies housed in its area,  Calamba is one of the premiere industrial hubs outside of Metro Manila. Some of the industrial parks located in the city are:
 Allegis IT Park (Barangay Milagrosa) 
 Calamba Premiere International Park (Barangays Batino, Barandal and Prinza)
 Canlubang Industrial Estate (Barangay Canlubang)
 Carmelray Industrial Park 1 (Barangays Canlubang) 
 Carmelray Industrial Park 2 (Barangays Milagrosa & Punta)
 Carmelray International Business Park (Barangay Canlubang) 
 Filinvest Technology Park (Barangays Punta, Burol, and Bubuyan) 
 Light Industry and Science Park of the Philippines II (Barangays Real and La Mesa) 
 NYK-TDG IT Park (Barangay Canlubang) 
 SMPIC Special Economic Zone (Barangay Paciano Rizal)
 YTMI Realty Special Economic Zone (Barangay Makiling)

Information technology 
Calamba is also considered one of the "Next Wave Cities" for outsourcing firms and call centers, among them are Accenture and SPi Technologies.

Commerce and trade 

Aside from the Crossing area in Barangay Uno, Barangays Real and Parian are also bustling with business structures, including SM City Calamba, and Liana's Discount Center Calamba.

Notable shopping centers and travel agencies in Calamba also include Southern Sky Travel & Tours (Calamba Headquarters), Walter Mart Makiling, Puregold Halang, Puregold Calamba-Crossing, Puregold Calamba-Bayan, Checkpoint Mall, and  among others.

Food processing plants in Calamba like Zenith Foods Corp. (central commissary of Jollibee Foods Corporation), where its sauces and food products (i.e. burger, pies, fries, etc.) are first made before distributing to Jollibee outlets is currently the most advanced food processing plant in the Philippines and one of the best in Asia. Other food and beverage processing plants in Calamba are Rebisco, RC Cola, Monde-M.Y. San Corporation and Zest-O Corporation.

Some of the semiconductor companies are also located in Calamba. To name a few, they are Samsung Electronics Philippines, Continental Temic Electronics Philippines, Toshiba Storage Device Philippines Inc., ST Microelectronics (formerly Philips Electronics), Fuji Electric Philippines, NEC Tokin Electronics, NEC Toppan Circuit Solutions and Austriamicrosystems Phils.

Automobile manufacturers that have plants located in Calamba are Asian Transmission Corporation and Suzuki Philippines Inc.

Avon, the leading global beauty company has a manufacturing plant (Avon Products Manufacturing), is located at Calamba Premiere International Park.

Infrastructure

Transportation

Tricycles, buses, jeepneys, and UV Express are popular modes of transportation in Calamba.

Calamba is served by the Philippine National Railways (PNR) Metro Commuter Line. Stations include: 
 Calamba, at the city proper. This will serve as the terminal for the North–South Commuter Railway (NSCR) and a stop for intercity trains headed for Bicol and Batangas.
 Pansol - flag stop, served by trains between Manila and the International Rice Research Institute (IRRI) in Los Baños.

Roads
The only expressway currently operational in Calamba is the South Luzon Expressway (SLEX), which passes through the city with four exits. SLEX is part of AH26 up to Calamba Exit.

Main national highways include the Manila South Road, the Pan-Philippine Highway (also known as Maharlika Highway, Daang Maharlika, or National Highway), which passes through the city and curves toward Santo Tomas in Batangas,  and Calamba–Pagsanjan Road (also called "National Highway") links Calamba with Los Baños and Santa Cruz.

Other arterial roads includes Chipeco Avenue and its Extension, which passes near the city hall, Tagaytay–Calamba Road, which picks up near Tagaytay Highlands, and Mayapa–Canlubang Cadre Road, a spur of Maharlika Highway serving Canlubang and Canlubang/Mayapa Exit (Exit 47)

Proposed expressways include the Calamba–Los Baños Expressway, which spurs from SLEX, traverses along Laguna de Bay and ends on a national highway at Bay, and Laguna Lakeshore Expressway Dike, an expressway and dike that will run on the coast of Laguna de Bay. The projects will cost an estimated ₱5.9 billion ($131.11 million) and ₱18.59 billion ($413 million).

Health care

There are 9 private and 1 government-run hospitals in Calamba. Some of the health centers in the city are the Calamba Medical Center, Calamba Doctors' Hospital, Pamana Golden Care Hospital, St. John the Baptist Hospital, San Jose Hospital and Trauma Center, St. Marks Hospital Medical Center, Holy Angel General Hospital, CH Garcia Medical and Diagnostic Center, Dr. Jose Rizal Memorial Hospital, and Jose Yulo Foundation Canlubang Industrial Hospital...

Utilities and communication 
Communication concerns are managed by different agencies found in the city: postal affairs rests on the Philippine Postal Corp. with three operating offices located in Barangays. Canlubang, Mayapa and the main office located at the back of City Hall. Telecommunications as well as internet connections are under the four major telecom companies such as PLDT (Smart Communications), Globe Telecom, Dito Telecommunity and Converge ICT.  Aside from these, print and radio services are also present, with Calambalita DZLN-AM and DZJV – a local radio station catering to the whole Calabarzon area.

A major part of the city is currently served by Meralco, with two substations of the company located in Brgys Mayapa and Brgy 1 facilitate the flow of power throughout the entire city. All the 54 barangays are equipped with electricity, with only a few barangays such as part of Canlubang, Pansol, Bucal and Lecheria under NAPOCOR.

A big part of the city is served by the Calamba Water District, providing water to 23,655 households, 1,238 commercial establishments and 53 public buildings.  Most of the city's water supply comes from the faucet community water system.

Government

Like other cities in the Philippines, Calamba is governed by a city mayor and city vice mayor who are elected to three-year terms. The city mayor is the executive head who leads the city's departments in the execution of city ordinances and in the delivery of public services. The city vice mayor heads a legislative council that is composed of 14 members: 12 councilors and two ex-officio offices: one for the Sangguniang Kabataan Federation President, representing the youth sector, and one for the Association of Barangay Chairmen President as the barangay sectoral representative. The council is in charge of creating the city's policies in the form of ordinances and resolutions.

By virtue of Republic Act no. 11078, Calamba has been separated from the 2nd District of Laguna to form its own, the Lone district of the City of Calamba.

Elected officials 

The 2022 local elections in Calamba, held on May 9, 2022, replaced some members of the city government, primarily on the members of the city council. The mayor and vice mayor are term limited.

Elected officials for the 2022–2025 term are:

List of former chief executives
Jose Rizal wrote a manuscript called Jefes del pueblo de Calamba (ang nangagsipagpuno sa bayan ng Calamba: sapol ng maging bayan, hangan sa panahon, 28 de Agosto, 1742 - hasta 1891) that is now kept in the National Library of the Philippines. It lists the names of local chief executives of Calamba since its founding as a town independent from Cabuyao. Their names were:

The following are the individuals that served as local chief executive of Calamba since the American occupation of the Philippines up to the present-day:

City seal

The seal of the City of Calamba has evolved and has been modified throughout the years. From being a municipality to a component city, a new seal was necessary to symbolize the new thrust of Calamba. In a citywide seal-making contest, Reyjon de Guzman emerged as winner, for his work best symbolized the ideals, pride and achievements of the city. Each color, shape, number and object has its own meaning relative to what is Calamba in the past, present and future.
 Shield shape – The shield shape in the center, with a slight circular bottom, flat top and curved edges at the top corners project solidity and congruence.
 Banga shaped twined with Dr. Jose Rizal's image – The historical ambience is depicted in this twin image. The abstract represents the influence of Dr. Jose Rizal and the Banga in the history of the City of Calamba.
 Numbers – the engraved "1742"  mentions the year when Calamba was founded and seceded from the town of Cabuyao, while "2001" was identified as the year of Calamba's cityhood.
 Objects – the mountain in the background and the water current at the bottom part relate to land and water resources of the city pertain to the vast natural resources of Mount Makiling and the aquatic benefits of Laguna de Bay. The water beneath Mt. Makiling shows that Calamba touches a body of water notably Laguna de Bay, the largest lake in the country, and that's why Calamba is also known as the "City by the Lake". The silhouette image of rice field on the left and the industrial buildings on the right symbolizing Calamba's rapid modernization, urbanization, and industrialization. With both signs located beside each other, it shows everyone that nature and progress can efficiently coexist in Calamba.
 Colors – Except for silver grey and metallic gold, all others are similar with the national seal. However, additional meanings are attached to each.
 Metallic gold – This represents the radiating image of Dr. Jose Rizal and Banga that reflects in the minds and deeds of Calambeños.
 Red – This symbolizes the burning patriotism of residents as exemplified by Rizal.
 Blue – As land and water represent wealth and prosperity, the color blue signifies productivity and tranquility of the constituents.
 Silver grey – This represents the transformation of development from an agricultural pueblo in the 1700s to an agro-industrial town in the 1900s and finally to an industrial city.
 White – This projects purity, transparency, efficiency and prudence pertaining to governance.
 Calamba has a golden edge etched at the upper half with the words Lungsod ng Calamba depicting Calamba as a Philippine component city. Laguna at the bottom part means that Calamba is still part of Laguna province.

Tourism 

Calamba is the location of José Rizal's birthplace, Rizal Shrine, found in the poblacion (city proper), and St. John the Baptist Parish Church, the location of Rizal's baptism. The statue sits on top of a 15-step podium, symbolizing one decade since Rizal was born. The monument was once cited as the tallest Jose Rizal Monument in the World, until a monument of Rizal was built in Santa Cruz, Laguna, for the Palarong Pambansa 2014. The monument was inaugurated by President Benigno Aquino III in preparation for the Jose Rizal's sesquicentennial birth anniversary on June 19, 2011.

Other tourist attractions include the Calamba Claypot (Banga or Calambanga), a large pot that is the namesake of the city, Republic Wakepark, a water sports park in the Nuvali mixed-use residential development in Canlubang, and Calamba Island, an islet off Laguna de Bay.

Being near to Mount Makiling, Calamba also hosts hot spring resorts, concentrated at barangays Pansol, Bucal and Bagong Kalsada near the boundary with Los Baños.

Culture

Festivals
The Buhayani Festival, the official festival of the City of Calamba was the brainchild of Mayor Justin Marc SB. Chipeco during his first year as Mayor in 2013. Mayor Timmy wanted the city to have a festival that will best characterize its culture, progress and tourism potential. He wanted to capitalize on the city's historical heritage as the birthplace of unofficial Philippine National Hero, Dr. Jose P. Rizal. Thus, the Buhayani Festival was born.

The term "Buhayani" was coined by joining two Filipino words, "buhay" meaning life or the state of being alive and lively and "bayani" or hero. The festival's tagline "Buhay ng Bayani, Buháy na Bayani" literally translates to "Life of the Hero"pertaining to the life of our famous kababayan, Dr. Jose Rizal and "Living Hero"which refers to the common man who has the capacity and potential to become everyday heroes in their own small ways.

"We want everyone who revere our kababayan, Dr. Jose Rizal to come to Calamba and join us in honouring him on his birthday and in celebrating the modern Rizal in us. We want to make our National Hero modern and relevant in today's challenging times and we want to celebrate the spirit of heroism that lives in each Filipino, not just in us Calambeños," Mayor Chipeco was quoted saying.

Different activities were lined up for this year's Buhayani Festival: Kuwentong Bayani for selected Grade 5 students, Talinong Rizal Quiz Bee, Buhayani Football Cup, Independence Day Job Fair, SayawIndak Street Dancing Competition, Marching Band Competition, Baile de Gala, Hawig Rizal (Rizal Look-a-Like), Buhayani Eye Care Mission, and a whole lot more. Highlighting this year's celebration is the Morning Program wherein Philippine National Police Chief, Director General Ronald "Bato" Dela Rosa is the Guest of Honor and Speaker. A special wreath-laying ceremony shall also commence at the Museo ni Rizal sa Calamba after a simultaneous floral offering at five different Rizal monuments around the city.

"Jose Rizal is not just the pride of Calamba, he is the pride of the entire country as he was the Greatest Malay to have lived. His works, teachings and ideals have inspired and will continue to inspire us as we strive to live up to his ideals of nationalism and love of country. In the Buhayani Festival, we celebrate an ideal and an advocacy that through this festival, we can rekindle the fire of patriotism and heroism in the hearts of every Filipino. Come to Calamba – retrace history's footsteps, rediscover the richness and uniqueness of our heritage, fire up our Filipino pride and be inspired to share and spread what you have experienced and be part of the force that will bring about a renewed love of country in every Filipino," Mayor Chipeco challenged.

Education

Calamba has a literacy rate of 98.9%. , there are 120 elementary schools, 51 of which are public and 69 private. There are 50 secondary schools, 16 public and 34 private. Post-secondary education include 17 universities and colleges, and 9 technical and vocational schools.

The city has four NCAA affiliate schools that set up branches in the city, namely as the Colegio de San Juan de Letran (Calamba Campus), Lyceum of the Philippines University (Laguna Campus), San Sebastian College – Recoletos (Canlubang Campus) and University of Perpetual Help System DALTA (Calamba Campus).

Some private schools that are also located in Calamba are City College of Calamba, Don Bosco College, Canlubang, Calamba Institute, Laguna College of Business and Arts, Saint Benilde International School, Asian Computer College, Inc., Asian Institute of Computer Studies, Inc. Active Community Contributor Calamba Churchitute, Inc. and the new university National University - Laguna, Philippine Women's University, Saint John Colleges, Maranatha Christian Academy.  In Nuvali Calamba, there are two other schools located which are the Miriam College and Xavier School. In the near future, Everest Academy, a renowned Catholic and international school will also open its second campus in Nuvali.

The City College of Calamba is the only public college in the city.

Notable personalities

 José Rizal – Philippine national hero, nationalist and reformist
 Paciano Rizal – revolutionary general, and the older brother of José Rizal
 Trinidad Rizal – feminist leader and co-founder of the Philippines' first feminist organization, the Asociacion Femenista Filipina.
 Delfina Herbosa de Natividad – one of the three women, together with Marcela Agoncillo and her daughter Lorenza, who seamed together the Flag of the Philippines. Niece of José Rizal.
 Vicente Lim – World War II Brigadier General
 Leopoldo B. Uichanco – Second Filipino Dean of UP College of Agriculture, Father of Philippine Entomology
 Dolores Ramirez – National Scientist of the Philippines for Biochemical Genetics & Cytogenetics
 Bienvenido O. Juliano – National Scientist of the Philippines for Biochemistry
 Jose Juliano – Filipino nuclear physicist and chemist
 José Yulo – 5th Speaker of the Philippine House of Representatives, 6th Chief Justice of the Supreme Court of the Philippines, former senator, 13th and 35th Secretary of the Department of Justice
 Dominador E. Chipeco, Sr. - 12th Governor of Laguna
 Restituto L. Luna – 14th Governor of Laguna
 Teresita S. Lazaro – 16th Governor of Laguna
 Ramil L. Hernandez – 18th Governor of Laguna
 Ronnie Alcano – professional pool player
 Maybelline Masuda – Filipino Brazilian Jiu-Jitsu practitioner
 John Vic De Guzman – volleyball player and actor
 Palito – Filipino comedian and actor
 Teody Belarmino – Filipino film actor
 Menggie Cobarrubias – Filipino film and television actor
 Therese Malvar – Filipina actress
 Lester Avan Andrada – Film actor
 Thea Tolentino – actress, Protégé: The Battle For The Big Artista Break winner
 Jeric Gonzales – actor, Protégé: The Battle For The Big Artista Break winner
 Sam Mangubat – Filipino singer, 2nd placer of Tawag ng Tanghalan
 Gigi De Lana – Filipina singer-songwriter, actress, dancer and commercial model, Tawag ng Tanghalan Semi-finalist

Sister cities

Locals
 Bacoor, Cavite
 Biñan, Laguna
 Cabanatuan
 Cabuyao, Laguna
 Imus, Cavite
 Mabalacat, Pampanga
 Mabitac, Laguna
 Ozamiz

International
  Geumcheon-gu, Seoul, South Korea
  Guri, Gyeonggi-do, South Korea
  Litomerice, Ústí nad Labem Region, Czech Republic
  Walnut, California, United States
  Wilhelmsfeld, Baden-Württemberg, Germany

References

External links

Calamba Business Directory Website
 [ Philippine Standard Geographic Code]
Philippine Census Information
Local Governance Performance Management System
Visit Laguna – Tourist Spot in Laguna, things to do in Laguna

 
Cities in Laguna (province)
Populated places established in 1742
1742 establishments in the Philippines
Populated places on Laguna de Bay
Component cities in the Philippines